The 2014 IAAF Combined Events Challenge was a series of combined events for decathletes and heptathletes consisting of five stand alone challenge events, a series of continental combined events championships, and the combined events portions of a series of international athletics championships and multi-sports games. The challenge is organised under the auspices of the world governing body of athletics, the International Association of Athletics Federations (IAAF).

Elite level competitors were crowned champions based on the aggregate points scored in three of the events. The total prize money available is US$202,000, split evenly between male and female athletes. The male and female winners each receive $30,000, while second and third placed athletes are entitled to $20,000 and $15,000 respectively. Smaller prizes are given to the rest of the top eight finishers.

Calendar

The 2014 challenge takes in five challenge events, a number of regional combined events championships, and the combined events portions of a series of regional and international athletics championships.

Results

Medal summary

Men

Women

Overall
These are the overall rankings for all athletes who participated in three or more events.

Men

Women

References

2014
Combined Events Challenge